The Malolos Historic Town Center is a historic district located in downtown (or the old town center of the capital town of) Malolos City, Bulacan, Philippines, commonly called the Camestisuhan or Pariancillo District of Malolos. It was declared as such for its collection of Spanish and American-era houses and government structures, and for being the birthplace of the First Philippine Republic and the Malolos Constitution as well as having been the capital of the Philippines from 1898 to 1900. The National Historical Institute (now the National Historical Commission of the Philippines) declared the downtown Malolos area officially as a National Historical Landmark and a Heritage Town on August 15, 2001.

History

The Camestisuhan District of Malolos was originally called Pariancillo. It was the district intended for the Chinese residents of Malolos in the 1700s. It was started in 1755 when the Governor General of the Philippines ordered the expulsion of the Chinese from the Philippines due to their participation in some rebellion and sedition acts against the Spanish Government.

On documents such as the Registros Paroquiales or The Catholic Baptismal Registry of Malolos, the town already had its own "Parian" (a kind of Chinatown) in 1710. Some of the Chinese in Manila transferred to Malolos as it was already a hub for some Chinese and so that they could be far from the eyes of the Spanish Government in Manila. When he heard about this migration, the Governor General ordered that all Chinese migration destinations outside Manila should have a district for the Chinese for racial segregation. Thus the Malolos Pariancillo was established. Pariancillo means "small parian". A provision in the segregation order also stated that only those Chinese who have long been residents of the town who have married a native of Malolos will not be expelled. Thus the Sangleys of Malolos were born and the Pariancillo became the Chinese enclave in Bulacan Province.

Rationale for the district's declaration as a Historic Town Center
The National Historical Institute board resolution cites several reasons for the declaration of certain areas in downtown Malolos as a National Historical Landmark and Heritage Town, or informally as parts of a Historic Town Center:
 A number of men and women from Malolos became key figures in revolutionary movements during the Spanish era;
 Malolos was declared the capital of the First Philippine Republic and its Spanish-era infrastructure were reused as government offices, e.g. the convent of the Malolos Cathedral, Barasoain Church, and several houses along the Pariancillo/Kamestisuhan district;
 Malolos has retained a good number of noteworthy old houses and other buildings that attest to the artistry, craftsmanship and ingenuity of its builders

Declared areas
According to the board resolution, the following streets are identified as part of the Malolos Historic Town Center:

Built heritage

Within the declared Heritage District
The following table lists down extant built heritage within the areas declared by the National Historical Institute: 

|}

Outside the Declared Area
The following table lists of structures in Malolos extant built heritage outside the declared National Historical Landmark by the National Historical Institute but are still covered by the National Cultural Heritage Act of 2009 as cultural property:

|}

Important Cultural Properties

One of the features of Malolos Historic Town Center are the monuments created by the artisans and National Artist can be found at different areas in the city.

See also
 Philippine Registry of Cultural Property

References

External links
 List of Board Resolutions of the National Historical Commission of the Philippines
 Republic Act No. 10066 - National Cultural Heritage Act of 2009

Malolos
Heritage Houses in the Philippines
National Historical Landmarks of the Philippines
Heritage zones in the Philippines